Group A of the 2013 CONCACAF Gold Cup was one of three groups competing of nations at 2013 CONCACAF Gold Cup. The group's first round of matches were played on July 7, with the final round played on July 14. All six group matches were played at venues in the United States, in Pasadena, California, Seattle and Denver. The group consisted of six-time (and defending) Gold Cup champions, Mexico, as well as 2000 Gold Cup champion Canada, Martinique and Panama.

Standings

All times are EDT (UTC−4)

Canada vs Martinique

Mexico vs Panama

Panama vs Martinique

Mexico vs Canada

Panama vs Canada

Martinique vs Mexico

References

External links
 Official website 

A